On computer keyboards, the enter key  and return key  are two closely related keys with overlapping and distinct functions dependent on operating system and application.

Functions
The return key has its origins in two typewriter functions: carriage return, which would reset the carriage to the beginning of the line of text, and line feed, which would advance the paper one line downward. These were often combined into a single return key, a convention that continues in modern computer word processing to insert a paragraph break (¶).

The enter key is a computer innovation, which in most cases causes a command line, window form, or dialog box to operate its default function.  This is typically to finish an "entry" and begin the desired process, and is usually an alternative to clicking an OK button. Additionally, it can act as the equal to  button in calculator programs.
On modern computers both keys generally have all the functions of the other, allowing for either key to be used, or even for them to be combined into a single key, as is the case with most laptops. Microsoft Windows makes no distinction between them whatsoever, and usually both keys are labelled as enter on Windows keyboards with the United States layout. Other operating systems, such as Apple's Darwin-based OSs, generally treat them equivalently while still maintaining the technical and descriptive distinction, allowing applications to treat the two keys differently if necessary.

Location

On ISO and JIS keyboards, return is a stepped double-height key spanning the second and third rows, below  and above the right-hand .

Some variants of the ANSI keyboard layout create a double-height return key by subsuming the backslash  key into it. This alternate form is most popular in Asia, particularly Russia and Korea. However, this requires the relocation of the backslash key and is relatively uncommon on modern keyboards elsewhere.

Keyboard symbols

On most ISO and other keyboards worldwide the return key is labelled solely with the  symbol across all platforms.

For enter,  exists in Unicode for the ISO 9995-7 enter key symbol; however, it is infrequently used, one example being the French Canadian keyboard. Windows keyboards worldwide tend to simply label the key with the text , while Apple uses the symbol  ( or ) on ISO and JIS keyboards and the text  on ANSI US keyboards; this is acknowledged by an annotation "enter key" on U+2324 in the Unicode code chart.

History

On IBM's 3270 and 5250 line of terminals, the Enter key was located to the right of the space bar and was used to send the contents of the terminal's buffer to the host computer. The Return key was located in a more standard location and was used to generate a new line.

Apple also took advantage of this situation to create an editable command line environment called a "Worksheet" in the Macintosh Programmer's Workshop, where return was used strictly as a formatting key while enter was used to execute a shell command or series of commands in direct mode. This strict dichotomy has since been relaxed, so that now there are very few situations within macOS where enter and return are not equivalent.

One example of this continued division of use is the type tool in Adobe Photoshop, where the return key produces a new line while the enter key ends editing mode. Another is Mathematica, where the Return key creates a new line, while the Enter key (or Shift-Return) submits the current command for execution.

Historically, many computer models did not have a separate keypad, and only had one button to function as Enter or Return.  For example, the Commodore 64 (manufactured from 1982) had only the "Return" key. Most laptop computers continue in this combined tradition.

Before computers, on electric typewriters the "Return" key was kept comparatively large. This is due to the frequency of usage (which also includes the space bar), and therefore, is kept large to reduce the likelihood of finger slips.

See also

 Carriage return
 Numeric keypad

References

Computer keys

da:Tastatur#Enter